The Cathedral of Saint Paul is a Roman Catholic cathedral in the city of St. Paul, Minnesota. It is the co-cathedral of the Archdiocese of Saint Paul and Minneapolis, along with the Basilica of Saint Mary in Minneapolis. One of the most distinctive cathedrals in the United States, it sits on Cathedral Hill overlooking downtown St. Paul and features a distinctive copper-clad dome. It is dedicated to Paul the Apostle, who is also the namesake of the City of St. Paul. The current building opened in 1915 as the fourth cathedral of the archdiocese to bear this name. On March 25, 2009, it was designated as the National Shrine of the Apostle Paul by the United States Conference of Catholic Bishops. It is the third-largest Catholic cathedral and sixth-largest church in the United States.

History

Previous cathedrals 

The first church building in what became the Archdiocese of Saint Paul and Minneapolis was a small log chapel built at the urging of Father Lucien Galtier. He came to the area when the settlement was still known as "Pig's Eye" (after Pierre "Pig's Eye" Parrant). Father Augustin Ravoux later enlarged the structure, and when Joseph Crétin was appointed as the bishop of the newly established Diocese of St. Paul in July 1851, the log chapel became the first cathedral. Crétin immediately started to build a larger church to serve the fast-growing population of St. Paul. The second church building had three stories, with a library, kitchen, and school facilities on the first floor; the church itself on the second floor; and offices and living quarters for Crétin and his staff. The second building still proved to be too small for the needs of the diocese, so he started plans for a third cathedral in 1853. Construction of the building, at the corner of St. Peter and Sixth Streets in Downtown St. Paul, started in 1854 and was completed in 1858, having been delayed by the Panic of 1857 and Crétin's death. Thomas Grace was the bishop at the time the cathedral was completed.

Current building 

The building of the current cathedral was instigated by Archbishop John Ireland in 1904. The site was formerly occupied by the deteriorating mansion of entrepreneur Norman Kittson. Charles H.F. Smith (the head of the Finance Committee) and Alpheus Beede Stickney, two businessmen in St. Paul, purchased the land and donated it to the archdiocese. At Ireland's direction, the archdiocese commissioned well-known French Beaux-Arts architect Emmanuel Louis Masqueray, who was also the chief architect of the 1904 World's Fair in St. Louis, Missouri, and construction began in 1906. He had a budget of $1 million, and he based the cathedral on the designs of French churches of Périgueux Cathedral at Périgueux and Sacre-Coeur basilica in Paris, as well as French Renaissance and Classical themes.

Masqueray's open design allows visitors unobstructed views of the altar and pulpit. Masqueray died in 1917, having completed only a few designs for the interior, which included three of the cathedral's major chapels: Saint Peter's, Saint Joseph's and the Blessed Virgin Mary's.

In 1987 the cathedral acquired five bronze bells cast in France. The copper dome was renovated in 2002.

In 2013, in conjunction with the restoration of the cathedral's Æolian-Skinner organ by Quimby Pipe Organs, a new organ case was completed by architect Duncan G Stroik. The hand-carved walnut organ case preserves the view of the cathedral's rose window. Human-sized carved angels stand on both sides of the organ case and a statue of Saint Cecilia, patron saint of music, stands on top of the central organ case dome, directly below the rose window.
The cathedral is normally open from 7 a.m. to 6 p.m. seven days a week. The building was added to the National Register of Historic Places in 1974. It is also a contributing property to the Historic Hill District. On March 25, 2009, the United States Conference of Catholic Bishops declared the Cathedral of Saint Paul to be a National shrine – the first in Minnesota and the only one in North America dedicated to the Apostle Paul. The cathedral is now also known as the National Shrine of the Apostle Paul.

The cathedral was visited by Eugenio Pacelli two years before his election to the Papacy in 1939.

Nearby Catholic high schools Saint Thomas Academy, Cretin-Derham Hall, and Hill-Murray School use the Cathedral every year for their graduation services.

Design 

Warm-colored paint and gold leaf were added during a major renovation of the dome in the 1950s. The exterior walls of the cathedral are Rockville granite from St. Cloud, Minnesota (from the Clark quarry). The interior walls are American Travertine from Mankato, Minnesota. The interior columns are made of several types of marble.

The interior is illuminated by twenty-four stained glass windows featuring angelic choirs. There is also a rose window in the transept designed by Charles Connick. Electric lighting was installed in 1940.

Heroic size marble statues of the four evangelists, sculpted by John Angel, are set into the niches of the piers in the four corners of the church. This placement was not coincidental, according to Msgr. Lawrence Ryan (Historical Sketch of the Cathedral of St. Paul, 1904–1937), for as the piers hold up the church of stone, so the Word recorded by Matthew, Mark, Luke and John sustains that Church not made by human hands. Each statue rises to a height of 11’6” and weighs eight tons. The life of Saint Paul is honored by a bronze baldachin, as well as massive bronze Te Deum and Magnificat grilles. The cathedral also has six chapels dedicated to the patron saints of the European ethnic groups that settled the area around the city: St. Anthony for the Italians, St. John the Baptist for the French Canadians, St. Patrick for the Irish, St. Boniface for the Germans, Saints Cyril and Methodius for the Slavs; and St. Therese of Lisieux for the missionaries.
There are also chapels dedicated to the Sacred Heart, to Mary, the mother of Jesus, and to Saint Joseph, her husband, as well as to Saint Peter.

See also
List of Catholic cathedrals in the United States
List tallest domes 
List of tallest buildings in St. Paul
List of shrines#United States
St. Paul's Cathedral (disambiguation) for other Cathedrals of St. Paul

References

Other sources
Ernster, Barb. "Cathedral is Catechism in Stone and Glass: National Shrine Honors Paul the Apostle". National Catholic Register, June 20, 2010, p. B5.

External links

Roman Catholic Archdiocese of Saint Paul and Minneapolis website

Roman Catholic churches in Saint Paul, Minnesota
Individually listed contributing properties to historic districts on the National Register in Minnesota
National Register of Historic Places in Saint Paul, Minnesota
Churches on the National Register of Historic Places in Minnesota
Paul Saint Paul
Roman Catholic churches completed in 1915
Beaux-Arts architecture in Minnesota
Church buildings with domes
20th-century Roman Catholic church buildings in the United States